Los días del pasado is a 1978 Spanish film directed by Mario Camus. A teacher working in a mountain village in the hope of finding her boyfriend, is harassed after the Civil War.

Cast
Manuel Alexandre as Inspector de Educación
Sonsoles Benedicto as Amalia
Gustavo Bergés	as Angelín
Saturno Cerra as Saturnino
Antonio Gades as Antonio
Antonio Iranzo as Pepe
José María Labernié as Guardia Civil
Marisol as Juana
Mario Pardo as Miliciano
Claudio Rodríguez as Cabo
Juan Sala
Fernando Sánchez Polack as Lucio
José Yepes as Miliciano

References

External links
 

1978 films
Spanish drama films
1970s Spanish-language films
Films about the Spanish Maquis
1970s Spanish films